Michael Riley (born February 4, 1962) is a Canadian actor. From 1998 to 2000, he portrayed Brett Parker in Power Play. He has acted in over 40 films and television series, including This Is Wonderland, for which he received a Gemini Award, and the Emmy-nominated BBC / Discovery Channel co-production Supervolcano. He also portrays a leading character in the 2009 CBC Television series Being Erica.

Riley was born in London, Ontario, and graduated from the National Theatre School in Montreal, Quebec in 1984. Riley's first screen appearance was in the film No Man's Land (1987).

As a stage actor, he received a Dora Mavor Moore Award nomination for his performance as Arkady in George F. Walker's Nothing Sacred in 1988.

He has voiced the animated title character of Ace Lightning.

Filmography
No Man's Land (1987) - Horton
The Private Capital (1989) -
Diplomatic Immunity (1991) - Les Oberfell
Perfectly Normal (1991) - Renzo Parachi
To Catch a Killer (1992) - Lieutenant Joseph 'Joe/Polock' Kozenczak
Because Why (1993) - Alex
Lifeline to Victory (1993) - Paul Devereaux
Mustard Bath (1993) - Matthew Linden
The Making of '...And God Spoke (1993) - Clive Walton
Race to Freedom: The Underground Railroad (1994) - Boss
Butterbox Babies (1995) - Russell Cameron
French Kiss (1995) - M. Campbell
Strauss: The King of 3/4 Time (1995) - Johann Strauss Jr.
The Possession of Michael D. (1995) - Dr. Nick Galler
Heck's Way Home (1996) - Rick Neufeld
The Grace of God (1996) - Chip
The Prince (1996) - Roy Timmons
Voice from the Grave (1996) - Adam Schuster
Amistad (1997) - British Officer
Every 9 Seconds (1997) - Ray
Pale Saints (1997) - Dody
Heart of the Sun (1998) - Father Ed
Ice (1998) - Greg
Dogmatic (1999) - Dennis Winslow
Win, Again! (1999) - John Morrissey
Mile Zero (2001) - Derek
100 Days in the Jungle (2002) - Rod Dunbar
Black Swan (2002) - Carl
Punch (2002) - Sam
The Interrogation of Michael Crowe (2002) - Stephen Crowe
America's Prince: The John F. Kennedy Jr. Story (2003) - Douglas Conte
Homeless to Harvard: The Liz Murray Story (2003) - Peter
Cube Zero (2004) - Jax
Her Perfect Spouse (2004) - Ty Kellington
Saving Emily (2004) - Kurt
Sugar (2004) - The Man
Supervolcano (2005) - Richard 'Rick' Lieberman
Normal (2007) - Carl
Race to Mars (2007) - Captain Richard Erwin 
What You're Ready For (2007) - Dr. Edgar O. Laird
The Tenth Circle (2008) - Mike Bartholomy
Mr. Nobody (2009) - Harry
Like a House on Fire (2021) - Jack

Television
The Edison Twins (1985) as Winston / Gregory (2 episodes)
Chasing Rainbows (1988) as Christopher Blaine
Street Legal (1993) as Adam Ruskin (2 episodes)
Due South (1995) as Walter Sparks (1 episode)
Power Play (1998–2000) as Brett Parker (26 episodes)
The Outer Limits (1999–2000) as Gerard / Jon Tarkman (2 episodes)
The Way We Live Now (2001) as Hamilton K. Fisker (3 episodes)
CSI: Crime Scene Investigation (2003) Lady Heather's Box (1 episode)
This Is Wonderland (2004–2006) as Elliot Sacks (39 episodes)
Flashpoint (2009) as Pat Cosgrove (1 episode)
Being Erica (2009–2011) as Dr. Tom (Main Role)
Willed to Kill (2012 TV Movie) as Dr. Aaron Kade

References

External links

1962 births
Canadian male film actors
Canadian male stage actors
Canadian male television actors
Canadian male voice actors
Best Actor in a Drama Series Canadian Screen Award winners
Living people
Male actors from London, Ontario
National Theatre School of Canada alumni
Alumni of Ulster University